Herman Son Winningham (born December 1, 1961) is an American former professional baseball player. He played all or part of nine seasons in Major League Baseball (MLB), primarily as a center fielder, for the New York Mets, Montreal Expos, Cincinnati Reds and Boston Red Sox.

Career
Drafted by the New York Mets in the 1st round of the 1981 Major League Baseball Draft, Winningham made his major league debut with the Mets on September 1, 1984.  At one time a highly regarded prospect in the New York Mets chain, he was a part of the Gary Carter trade, along with Hubie Brooks, Floyd Youmans and Mike Fitzgerald.  His talents never caught up to his statistics as he was primarily a reserve outfielder for most of his career.  His final game was with the Boston Red Sox on October 3, 1992.

Winningham was a member of the Cincinnati Reds team that defeated the Pittsburgh Pirates in the 1990 National League Championship Series and the Oakland Athletics in the 1990 World Series. In the last game of the World Series he replaced an injured Billy Hatcher, went 2-3 and scored the winning run. During the 1990 postseason, he batted .364.

Post-playing career 
Winningham is currently the head coach of the Orangeburg-Wilkinson High School baseball team in his hometown of Orangeburg.

External links

Retrosheet
Venezuelan Professional Baseball League

1961 births
Living people
African-American baseball coaches
African-American baseball players
American expatriate baseball players in Canada
Baseball coaches from South Carolina
Baseball players from South Carolina
Boston Red Sox players
Cincinnati Reds players
Georgia Perimeter Jaguars baseball players
Indianapolis Indians players
Jackson Mets players
Kingsport Mets players
Leones del Caracas players
American expatriate baseball players in Venezuela
Lynchburg Mets players
Major League Baseball center fielders
Major League Baseball replacement players
Montreal Expos players
New York Mets players
Norfolk Tides players
Pawtucket Red Sox players
People from Orangeburg, South Carolina
Tidewater Tides players
21st-century African-American people
20th-century African-American sportspeople